Dordi Agate Nordby (born 8 April 1964 in Bærum) is a retired Norwegian curler from Snarøya. Nordby has amassed an array of medals in major international competitions over a career spanning three decades, including two world championship gold medals and two European championship gold medals.

Career
Having made her international debut for Norway as early as 1981, Nordby played for her country at the curling exhibition event in the Calgary Winter Olympics, where the team won a 'bronze medal' - which of course had no official status.  She first won a medal at the world championships in 1989, playing third in the Norway team that finished as runners-up.  As skip of the team in 1990 and 1991, Dordi reached the pinnacle of her career to date by leading Norway to back-to-back gold medals.

Although she has yet to quite recapture that form, the Norway team she has almost invariably continued to skip at major championships has maintained a remarkable consistency, netting bronze medals in 1993, 1995, 1996, 2000 and 2002, and a silver in 1997.  She has so far, however, failed in her quest to win a 'real' Olympic medal for Norway, finishing fifth in Nagano in 1998, seventh in Salt Lake City in 2002, and fourth in Turin in 2006.

Nordby suffered a blow when the international career of her long-term lieutenant Hanne Woods finally succumbed to a long-term knee complaint. However, the promising junior Linn Githmark was co-opted to play third in the team at the 2004 world championships, and a transition was successfully achieved as Norway picked up a silver medal, with yet another bronze following in 2005. However, as of the 2005 European Championships, Githmark is no longer on the team.

In 2003 Nordby won the Frances Brodie Award, which is an award that is presented to the player deemed to have displayed the best sportsmanship throughout the championship, as voted on by all of the players competing. She also brings a thermos of coffee to every game she plays, and used to be a chain-smoker, but says she has quit smoking after 25 years. Nordby has said she will continue curling until "my knees break". However, after a disappointing 2006 European Curling Championships in which she failed to qualify Norway for the 2007 Worlds, Nordby announced her retirement from the sport in January 2007.

In 2019 Nordby was inducted into the World Curling Hall of Fame, and was awarded the Elmer Freytag Award.

Teammates
 Marianne Haslum (third)
 Camilla Holth (lead) 
 Marianne Rørvik (second)
 Charlotte Hovring (alternate)

References

External links

Norwegian female curlers
Curlers at the 2006 Winter Olympics
Living people
1964 births
Curlers at the 2002 Winter Olympics
Curlers at the 1998 Winter Olympics
Curlers at the 1992 Winter Olympics
Curlers at the 1988 Winter Olympics
World curling champions
Sportspeople from Bærum
Olympic curlers of Norway
Medalists at the 1992 Winter Olympics
Medalists at the 1988 Winter Olympics
Olympic silver medalists for Norway
Olympic bronze medalists for Norway
Continental Cup of Curling participants
European curling champions